Kaoma is a town in Zambia. It is the headquarters of Kaoma District in the Western Province and is located on the M9 Road.

Location
At Kaoma, the Lusaka-Mongu Road (M9), meets the Kaoma-Kasempa Road (D301). This location lies west of Kafue National Park. The coordinates of the town are: 14 48 00S, 24 48 00E (Latitude: -14.8000; Longitude: 24.8000).

History
Kaoma has previously been known by other names including: Nkoya, Mankoya, Mankoye, Nankoya, Nunkoya. The official name of the town was changed to Kaoma in 1964. The name Nkoya came from the first Zambian ethnic group to settle in the area around the 6th century. The Nkoya people can be found in Kaoma and the surrounding areas such as Mumbwa, Mulobezi, Kazungula, Mungulula (Mongu), Kalabo, Lukulu amongst other districts. The Nkoya people celebrate an annual traditional ceremony called the Kazanga Ceremony, which is held between April and August in Kaoma District, under Chief Mwene Mutondo and Chief Kahare of the Nkoya people.

Population
In 2006, the population of Kaoma was estimated at 14,200.
Kaoma is now divided into three districts namely Kaoma, Nkeyema and Luampa.

Landmarks
The landmarks within the town of Kaoma or close to its borders include the following:

 The headquarters of Kaoma District Administration
 The offices of Kaoma Town Council
 A branch of Finance Bank Zambia Limited (FBZ)
 Kaoma Airport - A public, civilian airport, with one runway.
 Kaoma Farmers Market - The largest source of fresh produce in the town.
 Kaoma District Hospital - A public 100-bed hospital.
 Kaoma Cheshire Orphanage - An orphanage administered by the Irish charity, Touch Ireland. The orphanage takes care of an estimated 70 AIDS orphans, from birth to 4 years of age.
 Murals by Kozhi Kawina - This local artist has painted the murals on the walls of the district hospital, the doctors' residences and the Cheshire orphanage.
 The Kaoma Women's Center, located off Freedom Road near the main junction.  The Women's Center provides high school and college scholarships, as well as vocational training and education for local women.  It is a joint enterprise between the Kaoma WISE Trust and the American non-profit organization, Women's Initiatives that Strengthen and Empower.
 Maranatha Grassroots Institute is located in Mulammatila area on plot number 1637 Kahare Street. It is one of the most vibrant local NGO in Kaoma. The Institute offers vocational skills training to youths. It also has a community library and is involved in various community services.  The moral education department runs a music ministry called the Shalom Music Ministry.

New district hospital
A new district hospital is under construction to replace the old buildings of the old hospital, which was constructed in the 1950s. Funding for the new hospital is through donations from overseas charitable organizations including:
 Foundation Medical Committee Kaoma, an initiative by donors from the Netherlands.
 TOUCH Ireland, a charitable organization based in the Republic of Ireland. - They will build the children's wing of the new hospital.
 Orange Babies, another charity based in the Netherlands - They will construct the women's wing of the new hospital.
 The hospital is still seeking new donors to complete the project.

See also
 Lusaka
 Kasempa
 Mongu
 Great West Road, Zambia

References

External links
Image of Downtown Kaoma

Populated places in Western Province, Zambia